Blues One is an album by jazz pianist Chris Anderson which was recorded and released on the DIW label in 1991.

Track listing
 "The End of a Beautiful Friendship" (Donald Kahn, Stanley Styne) - 4:12
 "Star Eyes" (Don Raye, Gene DePaul) - 7:32 	
 "Someday My Prince Will Come" (Frank Churchill, Larry Morey) - 7:19
 "Blue Bossa" (Kenny Dorham) - 6:46
 "I Can't Get Started" (Vernon Duke, Ira Gershwin) - 7:08 	
 "Blues One" (Chris Anderson) - 7:04
 "The Summer Knows" (Michel Legrand, Alan and Marilyn Bergman) - 7:14

Personnel
Chris Anderson - piano
Ray Drummond - bass
Billy Higgins - drums

References

1991 albums
Chris Anderson (pianist) albums
DIW Records albums